Stephen Gibson  (born 9 January 1958) is a British entrepreneur and the chairman and owner of Middlesbrough Football Club. In May 2020, he was listed 481st on the Sunday Times Rich List, with a net worth of £270 million.

Gibson was born in Middlesbrough and raised in the Park End area of the town. Raised Catholic, he attended local schools, St Pius X Primary and St Mary's College. In 1979, he became Middlesbrough's youngest ever Labour councillor, being elected to represent Park End at age 21. He is the uncle of Norwich defender Ben Gibson.

Bulkhaul Limited
In 1981, he founded Bulkhaul Limited, a company dedicated to the global transportation of bulk liquids, powders and gases. He set up the company by borrowing £1,000 from his father.
The company operates from a UK base with Bulkhaul centres and offices worldwide. The company covers the principal global routes in European, Atlantic and Pacific regions, using a sophisticated computerised system to track and monitor its tank units in transit around the world and its own fleet of vehicles, both in the UK, and increasingly in Europe. They have done this by building close relationships with most of the world's first class chemical companies. Bulkhaul ceased manufacturing at Teesside, but its main base of operations remains in Middlesbrough.

Gibson is the majority owner of the Gibson O'Neill Company Ltd, the holding company for Bulkhaul with a 75% stake. Michael David O'Neill holds the remaining 25%. Gibson O'Neill has an annual turnover of £197,692,000, with annual profits of £29,720,000. The Gibson O'Neill group includes Bulkhaul, Middlesbrough FC and Rockliffe Hall Hotel. Gibson O'Neill profits increased from £5.9m to £23.7m for the year up to 30 June 2015.

Relationship with Middlesbrough F.C.

Taking control
Gibson is a lifelong Middlesbrough fan, having attended matches with Chris Kamara at Ayresome Park as a youngster. He joined the board as the club's youngest ever director at the age of 26 while Willie Maddren was manager. He helped save the club from liquidation by forming a consortium in 1986. In 1993, he bought Scottish & Newcastle's shares in the club, and succeeded Colin Henderson as the club's chairman in 1994, owning roughly 90% of the club.

Chairman
Gibson saw the club leave Ayresome Park in 1995 for the Riverside Stadium, a brand new all-seater stadium worth 54 million. He also made money available for the purchase of big-name players. Gibson's appointment of Bryan Robson as manager in May 1994 helped raise the profile of the club and achieve three Wembley cup final appearances within 12 months during 1997 and 1998. As a result of ongoing investment in supporting Robson's successor, Steve McClaren, in 2004 the club was able to win its first trophy in 128 years, the English League Cup. His tenure as chairman has also seen the club reach the UEFA Cup final, Europe's second biggest club cup competition. Gibson has since stated that his aim for the club is to see it play more regular European football. In 2004, Gibson was given the Freedom of Middlesbrough after the club won the English League Cup.

Gibson was appointed Officer of the Order of the British Empire (OBE) in the 2016 Birthday Honours for services to the economy, sport and the community on Teesside.

Politics
Before becoming involved with Middlesbrough FC, Gibson was the local Labour Party's youngest ever councillor. He has occasionally raised his profile when commenting on the local political situation. He did so when working with Middlesbrough's elected mayor Ray Mallon in 2009 in the fight to save Teesside's steel industry. They accused the Government and local Labour MP's of "betrayal", with Gibson quoted as saying: "We have got five Labour seats here. If the steelworkers lose their jobs, we are going to work our socks off to make sure the five MPs lose their jobs. It is an absolute betrayal."

In October 2015, Gibson launched a scathing attack on Stockton South Conservative MP James Wharton over the collapse of the Redcar steelworks, saying that he would "bury him" if he did not improve. Gibson later made peace with James Wharton and they jointly visited a local school to give a newspaper interview and explain the reconciliation. In March 2017, Gibson said that he would support the election of Labour's Sue Jeffrey in the forthcoming Tees Valley mayoral election. In May 2017, Gibson sent out a message of support to thousands of local residents for James Wharton's re-election campaign in the form of a letter.

References

1958 births
Living people
English football chairmen and investors
Middlesbrough F.C. directors and chairmen
English businesspeople
English Roman Catholics
Labour Party (UK) councillors
Councillors in North Yorkshire
People from Middlesbrough
Officers of the Order of the British Empire